Antigenidas may refer to:

 Antigenidas of Thebes, 4th century BC Greek musician and poet
 Antigenidas of Orchomenus, 4th century BC cavalryman to Alexander the Great